Sturton may refer to:

Places
Sturton le Steeple, a village in Nottinghamshire, England
Great Sturton, hamlet in the county of Lincolnshire, England
Sturton by Stow, a village and civil parish in the West Lindsey district of Lincolnshire, England
Sturton Grange, civil parish in the City of Leeds in West Yorkshire, England

People
Catriona Sturton, an Ottawa, Ontario based singer, songwriter
Edmund Sturton, an English composer of the Tudor period